Speranta is a Christian television channel in Romania, broadcast in the Romanian language. It is owned by the Seventh-day Adventist Church. Speranta features programming produced by Adventist churches, colleges, hospitals and institutions, covering religious, health, educational and family life topics. Speranta is a 24-hour broadcaster on satellite.

Speranta is part of the Hope Channel network.

See also 

 Media ministries of the Seventh-day Adventist Church
 Hope Channel

References

External links 
 

Television stations in Romania
Seventh-day Adventist media
Television channels and stations established in 2007